Bangladesh is a densely populated, low-lying, mainly riverine country located in South Asia with a coastline of  on the northern littoral of the Bay of Bengal. The delta plain of the Ganges (Padma), Brahmaputra (Jamuna), and Meghna Rivers and their tributaries occupy 79 percent of the country. Straddling the Tropic of Cancer, Bangladesh has a tropical monsoon climate characterised by heavy seasonal rainfall, high temperatures, and high humidity. Natural disasters such as floods and cyclones accompanied by storm surges periodically affect the country. Most of the country is intensively farmed, with rice the main crop, grown in three seasons. Rapid urbanisation is taking place with associated industrial and commercial development. Exports of garments and shrimp plus remittances from Bangladeshis working abroad provide the country's three main sources of foreign exchange income.

Physical geography

[[File:him.ogg|thumb|Satellite photographs (from Terra-MODIS) and computer-generated models help visualise Bangladesh's place in the world. Located in South Asia, it is virtually surrounded by India and the Bay of Bengal to the south. But in many ways, the country's fate is dominated by the world's highest mountain range looming to the north-the Himalayas.]]

The physical geography of Bangladesh is varied and has an area characterised by two distinctive features: a broad deltaic plain subject to frequent flooding, and a small hilly region crossed by swiftly flowing rivers. Bangladesh is bordered on the west, north, and east by a  land frontier with India and, in the southeast, by a short land and water frontier with Myanmar.

Roughly 80% of the landmass is made up of fertile alluvial lowland called the Bangladesh Plain. The plain is part of the larger Plain of Bengal, which is sometimes called the Lower Gangetic Plain. With such low elevations and numerous rivers, water—and concomitant flooding—is a predominant physical feature. About  of the total area of Bangladesh is covered with water, and larger areas are routinely flooded during the monsoon season.

The only exceptions to Bangladesh's low elevations are the Chittagong Hills in the southeast, the Low Hills of Sylhet in the northeast, and highlands in the north and northwest. The Chittagong Hills constitute the only significant hill system in the country and, in effect, are the western fringe of the north–south mountain ranges of Myanmar and eastern India. At  altitude, the highest elevation in Bangladesh is found at Saka Haphong, in the southeastern part of the hills. Fertile valleys lie between the hill lines, which generally run north–south. West of these hills is a narrow, wet coastal plain located between the cities of Chittagong in the north and Cox's Bazar in the south.

About 67% of Bangladesh's nonurban land is arable. Permanent crops cover only 2%, meadows and pastures cover 4%, and forests and woodland cover about 16%. The country produces large quantities of quality timber, bamboo, and sugarcane. Bamboo grows in almost all areas, but high-quality timber grows mostly in the highland valleys. Rubber planting in the hilly regions of the country was undertaken in the 1980s, and rubber extraction had started by the end of the decade. A variety of wild animals are found in the forest areas, such as in the Sundarbans on the southwest coast, which is the home of the royal Bengal tiger. The alluvial soils in the Bangladesh Plain are generally fertile and are enriched with heavy silt deposits carried downstream during the rainy season.

Human geography

Urbanisation is proceeding rapidly, and it is estimated that only 30% of the population entering the labour force in the future will be absorbed into agriculture, although many will likely find other kinds of work in rural areas. The areas around Dhaka and Comilla are the most densely settled. The Sundarbans, an area of coastal tropical jungle in the southwest and last wild home of the Bengal tiger, and the Chittagong Hill Tracts on the southeastern border with Myanmar and India, are the least densely populated.

Climate

Bangladesh has a tropical monsoon climate characterized by wide seasonal variations in rainfall, high temperatures, and high humidity. Regional climatic differences in this flat country are minor, though some variations can be seen between the weather pattern of the Northern and southern region, as the piedmontal plains of the northern region has a Monsoon influenced Humid subtropical climate. According to Bangladesh Meteorological Department, there are six seasons in Bangladesh depending on the temperature, rainfall and direction of wind- mild and cool Winter from December to February, hot and sunny Summer or pre Monsoon season from March to May, somewhat cooler and very wet Monsoon season from June to September and plesent, shorter and cooler Autumn or post monsoon season in October–November. April is the hottest month in most parts of the country.

Heavy rainfall is characteristic of Bangladesh causing it to flood every year. Because of its location just south of the foothills of the Himalayas, where monsoon winds turn west and northwest, the region of Sylhet in northeastern Bangladesh receives the greatest average precipitation. Average daily humidity ranged from March lows of between 55 and 81% to July highs of between 94 and 100%, based on readings taken at selected stations nationwide in 1986.

About 80% of Bangladesh's rain falls during the monsoon season. The monsoons result from the contrasts between low and high air pressure areas that result from differential heating of land and water. During the hot months of April and May hot air rises over the Indian subcontinent, creating low-pressure areas into which rush cooler, moisture-bearing winds from the Indian Ocean. This is the southwest monsoon, commencing in June and usually lasting through September. Dividing against the Indian landmass, the monsoon flows in two branches, one of which strikes western India. The other travels up the Bay of Bengal and over eastern India and Bangladesh, crossing the plain to the north and northeast before being turned to the west and northwest by the foothills of the Himalayas.

Natural calamities, such as floods, tropical cyclones, tornadoes, and tidal bores—destructive waves or floods caused by flood tides rushing up estuaries—ravage the country, particularly the coastal belt, almost every year. Between 1947 and 1988, 13 severe cyclones hit Bangladesh, causing enormous loss of life and property.

Annual monsoon flooding results in the loss of human life, damage to property and communication systems, and a shortage of drinking water, which leads to the spread of disease. For example, in 1988 two-thirds of Bangladesh's 64 districts experienced extensive flood damage in the wake of unusually heavy rains that flooded the river systems. Millions were left homeless and without potable water. Half of Dhaka, including the runway at the Shahjalal International Airport—an important transit point for disaster relief supplies—was flooded. About  of crops were reported destroyed, and relief work was rendered even more challenging than usual because the flood made transportation exceedingly difficult. A tornado in April 1989 killed more than 600 people, possibly many more.

There are no precautions against cyclones and tidal bores except giving advance warning and providing safe public buildings where people may take shelter. Adequate infrastructure and air transport facilities that would ease the suffering of the affected people had not been established by the late 1980s. Efforts by the government under the Third Five-Year Plan (1985–90) were directed toward accurate and timely forecast capability through agrometeorology, marine meteorology, oceanography, hydrometeorology, and seismology. Necessary expert services, equipment, and training facilities were expected to be developed under the United Nations Development Programme.

Cold weather is unusual in Bangladesh.

 Climate change 

River systems

The rivers of Bangladesh mark both the physiography of the nation and the life of the people. About 700 in number, these rivers generally flow south. The larger rivers serve as the main source of water for cultivation and as the principal arteries of commercial transportation. Rivers also provide fish, an important source of protein. Flooding of the rivers during the monsoon season causes enormous hardship and hinders development, but fresh deposits of rich silt replenish the fertile but overworked soil. The rivers also drain excess monsoon rainfall into the Bay of Bengal. Thus, the great river system is at the same time the country's principal resource and its greatest hazard.

The profusion of rivers can be divided into five major networks. At the point where the Brahmaputra meets the Tista River in Bangladesh, it becomes known as the Jamuna. The Jamuna is notorious for its shifting subchannels and for the formation of fertile silt islands (chars). No permanent settlements can exist along its banks.

The third network is the Surma-Meghna River System, which courses from the northeastern border with India to Chandpur, where it joins the Padma. Below the city of Kalipur it is known as the Meghna. When the Padma and Meghna join, they form the fourth river system—the Padma-Meghna—which flows  to the Bay of Bengal.

The numerous channels of the Padma-Meghna, its distributaries, and smaller parallel rivers that flow into the Bay of Bengal are referred to as the Mouths of the Ganges. Like the Jamuna, the Padma-Meghna and other estuaries on the Bay of Bengal are also known for their many chars.

A fifth river system, unconnected to the other four, is the Karnaphuli. Flowing through the region of Chittagong and the Chittagong Hills, it cuts across the hills and runs rapidly downhill to the west and southwest and then to the sea. The Feni, Karnaphuli, Sangu, and Matamuhari—an aggregate of some —are the main rivers in the region. The port of Chittagong is situated on the banks of the Karnaphuli. The Karnaphuli Reservoir and Karnaphuli Dam are located in this area. The dam impounds the Karnaphuli River's waters in the reservoir for the generation of hydroelectric power.

The Ganga–Brahmaputra rivers contribute nearly 1000 million tons/yr of sediment. The sediment contributed from these two rivers forms the Bengal Delta and Submarine fan, a vast structure that extends from Bangladesh to the south of the Equator which is up to 16.5 km thick, and contains at least 1130 trillion tonnes of sediment accumulating over the last 17 million years at an average rate of 665 million tons/yr. The Bay of Bengal used to be deeper than the Mariana Trench, the present deepest ocean point.

Water resources development has responded to this "dual water regime" by providing flood protection, drainage to prevent over flooding and waterlogging, and irrigation facilities for the expansion of winter cultivation. Major water control projects have been developed by the national government to provide irrigation, flood control, drainage facilities, aids to river navigation and road construction, and hydroelectric power. In addition, thousands of tube wells and electric pumps are used for local irrigation. Despite severe resource constraints, the government of Bangladesh has made it a policy to try to bring additional areas under irrigation without salinity intrusion.

Water resources management, including gravity flow irrigation, flood control, and drainage, were largely the responsibility of the Bangladesh Water Development Board. Other public sector institutions, such as the Bangladesh Krishi Bank, the Bangladesh Rural Development Board, the Bangladesh Bank, and the Bangladesh Agricultural Development Corporation were also responsible for the promotion and development of minor irrigation works in the private sector through government credit mechanisms.

Coastal systems

Bangladesh coastal areas are covering the south part of Bangladesh. The main rivers of Bangladesh derived from the Himalayas carry a high level of sediment and deposit it across the Bay of Bengal. This has led to major changes in the coastal region between 1989 and 2018. Over 30 years of morphological changes many islands are losing land area. However, there has been an overall net gain in the land area due to the regular acceleration process in other parts of those islands. In the west, new islands were found, but no significant changes were observed. At the mouth of the Meghna estuary, noticeable variable changes have been observed with the formation of many new islands.

In 1989, the land area was only 28835 km2 (56.06%), while the water area was 22600 km2 (43.94%) with the region falling among 20° 34’ N to 26°38 N and 88° 01’ E to 92° 41’ E, and with an area of 147,570 km2. In 2018, the land area increased to 29426 km2 (57.21%); an increase of 590 km2 (1.15%).  The land area in 1999 and 2009 was 56.49% and 56.68%, respectively, with a total increase of 0.19%. The island reformation tendency showed that the new land area increased every year by an average of 20 km2 (0.038) along the coastal region of Bangladesh. Plant growth has been observed in the newly formed islands over a period of 30 years. In the early stages, the islands are usually muddy waste areas that gradually changed into grasslands and Trees.

A recent global remote sensing analysis suggested that there were 2,262 km2 of tidal flats in Bangladesh and is therefore ranked 14th in terms of how much tidal flat occurs there. The analysis showed that the tidal flats of the Meghna River estuary have undergone considerable geomorphological change over a 33-year period, from 1984 to 2016, now only occurring in 17.1% of their initial extent despite expanding in area by 20.6%.

Area and boundaries

Area:total: 146,610 km2country comparison to the world: 85land: 130,170 km2water: 18,290 km2

Land boundaries:total: 4,427 kmborder countries: Myanmar 271 km, India 4,156 km

Coastline: 580 km

Maritime claims:territorial sea: contiguous zone:  exclusive economic zone: continental shelf: up to the outer limits of the continental margin

Elevation extremes:lowest point: Indian Ocean 0 mhighest point: Mowdok Taung in the Mowdok range at 1052 m (at N 21°47'12" E 92°36'36"), NOT Keokradong (883 m not 1,230 m) or Tazing Dong (985 m not 1,280 m as sometimes reported)

Resources and land use
Natural resources: natural gas, arable land, timber, coal

Land use:Arable land: 58.96%Permanent crops: 6.53%other: 34.51% (2012)

Irrigated land: 50,000 km2 (2008)

Total renewable water resources: 1,227 km3 (2011)

Freshwater withdrawal (domestic/industrial/agricultural):total: 35.87 km3/yr (10%/2%/88%)per capita: 238.3 m3/yr (2008)

Environmental concerns

Natural hazards:
Much of the country is submerged by floodwater in the monsoon season (and traditional settlements and agriculture are adapted to this); damaging floods occur when rivers rise higher than normal; tropical cyclones (hurricanes) and storm surges; droughts; riverbank erosion along the country's major rivers and in the Meghna estuary; earthquakes; possibly tsunamis.

Environment – current issues:
Country very densely populated (1,125 per km2); rapid urbanisation taking place; many people landless, and many live on and cultivate land exposed to floods, riverbank erosion or cyclones; groundwater used for drinking water and irrigation is widely contaminated with naturally-occurring arsenic in some floodplain areas; water-borne diseases prevalent; surface water widely polluted by industrial, agricultural and urban effluents, affecting domestic supplies and inland fisheries; intermittent water shortages because of falling water tables in some northern and central parts of the country; increasing water and soil salinity in some coastal areas, especially in the south-west, due to abstraction of river and groundwater upstream; soil degradation due to intensive cropping, depletion of organic matter and unbalanced use of fertilisers; deforestation and soil erosion in hill areas.

Environment – international agreements:party to:''
Biodiversity, Climate Change, Climate Change-Kyoto Protocol, Desertification, Endangered Species, Environmental Modification, Hazardous Wastes, Law of the Sea, Ozone Layer Protection, Ship Pollution, Wetlands

See also
 2007 South Asian floods
 Bangladesh Climate Change Resilience Fund
 List of islands of Bangladesh

References

 Attribution

Further reading
 Bangladesh Bureau of Statistics Yearbook of Bangladesh (published periodically online).

External links 
 Soil Maps of Bangladesh, European Digital Archive on the Soil Maps of the world

 
Articles containing video clips